Major-General Sir William Henry Alexander "Alec" Bishop  (20 June 1897 – 15 May 1984) was a British Army officer and administrator.

Military career
Bishop was born in Plymstock, Devon, the eldest child of Walter Edward Bishop and Eliza Knowles. He was educated at Plymouth College and the Royal Military College, Sandhurst. He was commissioned into the Dorset Regiment and served in India from 1919 to 1925. He also saw service in Mesopotamia and Palestine. After that he was in the War Office and the Colonial Office. He attended the Staff College, Camberley from 1927−1928.

In the Second World War, he served in East Africa, West Africa and North Africa but in 1944–45 was Director of Quartering at the War Office. In 1945 he became chief of information services and public relations of the Control Commission in Germany; from 1946 to 1948 he was deputy chief of staff and from 1948 to 1950 regional commissioner for North Rhine Westphalia. From 1962 to 1964, he was director of information services and cultural relations at the Commonwealth Relations Office and in 1964–65 British High Commissioner in Cyprus.

Sir Alec died in 1984 in Hastings, East Sussex, aged 86.

References

Bibliography

External links
Generals of World War II

1984 deaths
1897 births
British Army major generals
British Army personnel of World War I
Commanders of the Royal Victorian Order
Companions of the Order of the Bath
Dorset Regiment officers
High Commissioners of the United Kingdom to Cyprus
Knights Commander of the Order of St Michael and St George
Officers of the Order of the British Empire
People educated at Plymouth College
People from Plymstock
Graduates of the Royal Military College, Sandhurst
British Army generals of World War II
Graduates of the Staff College, Camberley
Military personnel from Plymouth, Devon
Civil servants in the Commonwealth Relations Office